Scène d'été, or Summer Scene, is an oil-on-canvas painting by the French artist Frédéric Bazille, completed in 1869, a year before his death in 1870, and now in the Fogg Art Museum in Cambridge, Massachusetts.  The impressionist painting depicts young men dressed in swimsuits having a leisurely day along the banks of Lez river near Montpellier. Bazille achieved the look he wanted for the painting by first drawing the human figures in his Paris studio and then transporting the drawings to the outdoor setting. Like his earlier painting Réunion de famille (1850), Scène d'été captured friends and family members in the outdoors and was exhibited at the Paris Salon in 1870.

It may have been an inspiration for Thomas Eakins' The Swimming Hole (1885), as Eakins was in Paris in 1870 and could have seen Bazille's painting.

References

1869 paintings
Paintings in the Harvard Art Museums
Bathing in art
Paintings by Frédéric Bazille